Jacob-Peter Mayer (1903–1992) was a German-born editor of the works of Alexis de Tocqueville and founder of the Tocqueville Research Centre at the University of Reading where he was Professor Emeritus. He was considered 'the foremost authority on the great French sociologist'.

Mayer was the editor of the Gallimard edition of de Tocqueville's Oeuvres Complètes (27 volumes, 1951–83), as well as the author of books on de Tocqueville, Marx and Max Weber. In 1943 Routledge, Kegan Paul in London published his Political Thought in France From the Revolution to the Fifth Republic. The book went into a third revised edition in 1961. This was followed by Max Weber and German Politics  (Routledge, London 1944.) In 1946 he published Sociology of Film: Studies and Documents (Faber, London). In the 1960s and 1970s he edited the book series European Political Thought for Arno Press, New York

In his youth he was a member of the German Social Democratic Party and active in the anti-Nazi movement of the 1930s. Mayer fled to England with his wife Lola (née Grusemann) in 1936, eventually settling in Stoke Poges near London. During the war he worked on German broadcasts for the Ministry of Economic Warfare. He became a British citizen in 1950.

References

Bibliography (selection)
 Translation of Thomas Hobbes' Leviathan: Leviathan - oder von Materie, Form und Gewalt des kirchlichen und bürgerlichen Staates, 1936
 Political Thought: The European Tradition. In co-Operation with R. H. S. Crossman, P. Kecskemeti, E. Kohn-Bramstedt, C. J. S. Sprigge. With an Introduction by R. H. Tawney. Dent, 1939
 Sociology of Film: Studies and Documents. Faber 1946
 Max Weber and German politics: a study in political sociology. Faber 1956.

Further reading
 Michael Sonenscher, "Power, populism and plots: A German refugee-scholar’s papers and the politics of mass society", The Times Literary Supplement, June 19, 2020.

1903 births
1992 deaths
University of Reading
German anti-fascists
German emigrants to the United Kingdom